Lester E. Mahr (February 23, 1903 – January 1, 1971) was an American Republican Party politician who served five terms representing Essex County in the New Jersey General Assembly.

Early life
He was born in Newark, New Jersey on February 23, 1903, the son of George L. Mahr and Louise E. Abrahams Mahr.  He was a 1924 graduate of New Jersey Law School.  He was admitted to the bar in 1924.

Political career
Mahr was elected to the New Jersey State Assembly in 1938, and was re-elected in 1939, 1940, 1941 and 1942.   He was the Chairman of the Assembly Committee on Elections.

In March, 1943, Mahr resigned his position as Counsel to Essex County Superintendent of Elections and Commissioner of Registration Anthony P. Miele following accusations that holding two state positions was in violation of the New Jersey Constitution.  Mahr maintained that there was no "constitutional incompatibility" in holding both jobs.

Family
Mahr married Carol Mason Cobb on June 21, 1929.  They had three children: Carol Lou Mahr, George L. Mahr, and Robert L. Mahr.

References

1903 births
1971 deaths
Politicians from Newark, New Jersey
Republican Party members of the New Jersey General Assembly
Rutgers School of Law–Newark alumni
20th-century American politicians
Lawyers from Newark, New Jersey
20th-century American lawyers